DeSoto County Schools is a public school district based in Hernando, Mississippi (USA) and serving all public school students in DeSoto County in the Memphis metropolitan area. With an enrollment of more than 30,000 students, DeSoto County is the largest school district in the state of Mississippi.

Schools

High schools
Grades 9-12
Center Hill High School (Olive Branch)
DeSoto Central High School (Southaven)
Hernando High School (Hernando)
Horn Lake High School (Horn Lake)
Lake Cormorant High School (Lake Cormorant)
Lewisburg High School (Olive Branch)
Olive Branch High School (Olive Branch)
Southaven High School (Southaven)

Middle schools
Grades 6-8
Center Hill Middle School (Olive Branch)
DeSoto Central Middle School (Southaven)
Hernando Middle School (Hernando)
Horn Lake Middle School (Horn Lake)
Lewisburg Middle School (Olive Branch)
Lake Cormorant Middle School (Lake Cormorant)
Olive Branch Middle School (Olive Branch)
Southaven Middle School (Southaven)

Intermediate Schools
Horn Lake Intermediate School (Horn Lake; Grades 3–5)
Olive Branch Intermediate School (Olive Branch; Grades 4–5)
Southaven Intermediate School (Southaven; Grades 3–5)

Elementary schools
Center Hill Elementary School (Olive Branch; Grades K-5)
Chickasaw Elementary School (Olive Branch; Grades 2–3)
DeSoto Central Elementary School (Southaven; Grades 3–5)
DeSoto Central Primary School (Southaven;Grades K-2)
Greenbrook Elementary School (Southaven; Grades K-2)
Hernando Elementary School (Hernando; Grades K-1)
Hernando Hills Elementary School (Hernando; Grades 2–3)
Horn Lake Elementary School (Horn Lake; Grades K-2)
Lewisburg Elementary School (Olive Branch; Grades K-5)
Oak Grove Central Elementary School (Hernando; Grades 4–5)
Olive Branch Elementary School (Olive Branch; Grades K-1)
Overpark Elementary School (Olive Branch; Grades K-5)
Pleasant Hill Elementary School (Olive Branch; Grades K-5)
Shadow Oaks Elementary School (Horn Lake; Grades K-2)
Southaven Elementary School (Southaven; Grades K-5)
Sullivan Elementary School (Southaven; Grades K-5)
Walls Elementary School (Walls; Grades K-4)
Lake Cormorant Elementary School (Lake Cormorant; Grades K-6)

Other Campuses
DeSoto County Alternative Center (Horn Lake)
DeSoto County Career and Technology Center West (Horn Lake)
DeSoto County Career and Technology Center East (Olive Branch)
Magnolia School (Horn Lake)

Demographics

2006-07 school year
There were a total of 28,738 students enrolled in the DeSoto County School District during the 2006–2007 school year. The gender makeup of the district was 48% female and 52% male. The racial makeup of the district was 26.05% African American, 67.91% White, 4.64% Hispanic, 1.22% Asian, and 0.18% Native American. 27.4% of the district's students were eligible to receive free lunch.

Previous school years

Integration
The school district did not integrate until forced to by court order in 1970. As recently as 1997, one school had two principals; a white principal to deal with white students and another black principal to deal with black students. Of the district's 42 schools, only two have black principals.

Suspension controversy
While blacks make up approximately one third of the student population, they receive well over half of the suspensions from school. In 2015, the NAACP filed a complaint with the U.S. Department of Education's Office of Civil Rights, alleging that the school district has violated the Civil Rights Act by discriminating "against Black students on the basis of race through its discipline policies and practices fostering a school-to-prison pipeline and fueling racial disparities." The suit asks the federal government to force the district to revise the vague code of conduct which allows for uneven punishments of minority students. The school district has a long history of violating federal mandates requiring civil rights reforms.  In addition to the racial disparities in suspension rates, they suit also alleges that punishments differ widely for the same actions. In one fight, for instance, a black student was suspended a week for shouting, while the white girl with whom she fought was suspended for only two days.

Accountability statistics

See also

List of school districts in Mississippi

References

External links

Education in DeSoto County, Mississippi
School districts in Mississippi
Southaven, Mississippi